Nikos Salikas (28 October 1940 – 21 June 2022) was a Greek politician.

A member of New Democracy, he served in the Hellenic Parliament from 1989 to 1993.

Salikas died on 21 June 2022 at the age of 81.

References

1940 births
2022 deaths
Greek MPs 1989 (June–November)
Greek MPs 1989–1990
Greek MPs 1990–1993
National Radical Union politicians
New Democracy (Greece) politicians
Aristotle University of Thessaloniki alumni
People from Rhodope (regional unit)